Lovely is a 2012 Telugu-language romantic comedy film written and directed by B. Jaya. The film was produced by B. A. Raju and Anup Rubens has composed the music for the film. The film stars Aadi and Shanvi Srivastava in the lead roles. The film was a joint production between R. R. Movie Makers and RJ Cinemas. Alongside direction, both editing and screenplay were also handled by B. Jaya. The movie was released on 30 March 2012 and became a hit at the box office. It was dubbed into Hindi as Vijay Meri Hai and remade in Odia in 2019 as Selfish Dil.

Plot 
Akash (Aadi) is a practical and easy going young guy and he does not have a very good opinion about women and love stories. His friend Kittu (Vennela Kishore) is in a Facebook relationship with a girl named Lalli (Chinmayee Ghatrazu). When the time comes to meet each other, Kittu develops cold feet and out of a fear of rejection, sends in Akash to meet Lalli. On the other side, Lalli decides to send her friend Lavanya (Shanvi) to the meeting. It is love at first sight for this ‘new’ couple and very soon, they develop a deep bond. Just when everything seems rosy for the lovebirds, Lavanya's father Mangalampalli Maharadhi (Rajendra Prasad) enters the scene and is not impressed with Akash's behaviour. It is now up to Akash to convince Maharadhi to change his mind.

Cast

Production 
It was announced that Aadi, Shanvi, Vennela kishore and other crew members will be in the film. Dr. Rajendra Prasad played an important role in this film.

Release 
The film was released on 30 March 2012.

Critical reception 
The "entertainment.oneindia.in" website has stated that "Overall, the film is an okay film with some decent entertainment values".

Box office 
The film has completed 50 days on 18 May 2012 in 34 centres. The film has completed 100 days run on 7 July 2012 in 12 centres.

Soundtrack 

The audio of the film was released on 13 March 2012 through Aditya Music label in the market. The launch of the audio was held at Prasad Labs in Hyderabad on same day. The soundtrack of the film was composed by Anoop Rubens and its consists of seven songs. The lyrics for three songs were written by Anantha Sreeram and another three songs were written by Ramajogayya Sastry, Kandikonda, Sirasri and one song was written by the music director of film Anoop Rubens.

References 

2012 films